= Kushalpura =

- village
- Location within Madhya Pradesh Location within India
- Coordinates: 23.167959°N 77.352544°E
- Country: India
- State: Madhya Pradesh
- District: Bhopal
- Tehsil: Huzur

Population (2011)
  - Total: 198
- Time zone: UTC+5:30 (IST)
- ISO 3166 code: MP-IN
- Census code: 482515

Kushalpura is a village in the Bhopal district of Madhya Pradesh, India. It is located in the Huzur tehsil and the Phanda block.

== Demographics ==
According to the 2011 census of India, Kushalpura has 41 households. The effective literacy rate (i.e. the literacy rate of population excluding children aged 6 and below) is 69.28%.

Demographics (2011 Census)
	Total	Male	Female
Population	198	97	101
Children aged below 6 years	32	12	20
Scheduled caste	134	64	70
Scheduled tribe	0	0	0
Literates	115	63	52
Workers (all)	94	49	45
Main workers (total)	76	43	33
Main workers: Cultivators	26	14	12
Main workers: Agricultural labourers	30	16	14
Main workers: Household industry workers	0	0	0
Main workers: Other	20	13	7
Marginal workers (total)	18	6	12
Marginal workers: Cultivators	0	0	0
Marginal workers: Agricultural labourers	10	2	8
Marginal workers: Household industry workers	0	0	0
Marginal workers: Others	8	4	4
Non-workers	104	48	56
